Southern Charm is an American reality television series that premiered on Bravo on March 3, 2014. The series chronicles the personal and professional lives of several socialites who reside in Charleston, South Carolina.

The show focuses on the Southern culture, along with the political history of the area, and has featured local historical places including Lewisfield Plantation and Mikell House. The show gives viewers an inside look at modern day aristocracy in Charleston, South Carolina.

Production
On July 14, 2014, Southern Charm was renewed for a second season, which premiered on March 16, 2015. Jenna King did not return. The second season featured Craig Conover, Shep Rose, Cameran Eubanks, Thomas Ravenel, and Whitney Sudler-Smith all returning, with Kathryn Calhoun Dennis and Landon Clements joining the main cast.

The third season premiered on April 4, 2016. All cast members returned from the previous season. The fourth season was announced on February 16, 2017, and premiered on April 3. Sudler-Smith left the main cast after season three, and was featured in a recurring capacity in following seasons. Conover, Rose, Eubanks, Ravenel, Dennis and Clements all returned for season four, with Austen Kroll being added to the main cast.

In February 2018, Bravo announced the fifth season and it premiered on April 5, 2018. Clements did not return, and Chelsea Meissner was promoted to the main cast for season five. In August 2018, Ravenel announced his departure from the show after five seasons due to sexual assault allegations against him, as well as claiming that the show "took advantage of him." Bravo confirmed his departure in September 2018 after Ravenel was arrested and charged with assault and battery. The sixth season premiered on May 15, 2019, with Eubanks, Rose, Conover, Dennis, Kroll, and Meissner all returning, with both Naomie Olindo and Eliza Limehouse added to the main cast.

Season seven was announced on September 24, 2020, and premiered on October 29, 2020. Filming of the seventh season was paused in spring 2020 due to the COVID-19 pandemic. In May 2020, it was confirmed that Cameran Eubanks, Naomie Olindo, and Chelsea Meissner would not be returning to the show for the seventh season. In August 2020, Eliza Limehouse confirmed that she too was departing the series ahead of season seven. Leva Bonaparte, Madison LeCroy, and John Pringle were introduced as series regulars, joining Conover, Rose, Dennis, and Kroll in the main cast.

Season 8 premiered on June 23, 2022, with Olivia Flowers, Venita Aspen, Chleb Ravenell and Taylor Ann Green joining Conover, Rose, Dennis, Kroll, Bonaparte, and Olindo as part of the main cast. Madison LeCroy and John Pringle were reduced to recurring roles, while Marcie Hobbs was introduced as a friend of the cast. Filming for the season wrapped in December 2021, and the trailer dropped on May 16, 2022.

Current cast

Main
Craig Conover,  2014—present 
Leva Bonaparte, (Guest: 2014—2019) 2020—present
Shep Rose,  2014—present
Austen Kroll, 2017—present
Madison LeCroy,  2019—present
Venita Aspen,  2020—present
Taylor Ann-Greene,  2020—present
Olivia Flowers,  2022—present
Rod Razavi, 2023—present
Jarrett Thomas, 2023—present
Rodrigo Reyes, 2023—present

Recurring
Patricia Altschul,  2014—present
Whitney Sudler-Smith,  (Main: 2014—2016) 2017—present
Paige Desorbo,  2022—present
Marcie Hobbs,  2022—present

Timeline of cast members

Episodes

Spin-offs
On October 27, 2016, Bravo ordered a spin-off series to Southern Charm, titled Southern Charm Savannah. The series follows the same premise as its predecessor series but is set in Savannah, Georgia. The series is produced by Haymaker Production and Aaron Rothman, Irad Eyal, Sara Nichols, Luke Neslage and Jessica Chesler, Jason Weinberg, Bryan Kestner and Whitney Sudler-Smith serve as the series' executive producers. The series premiered on May 8, 2017.

In April 2017, Bravo announced it was ordering two spin-offs, Southern Charm New Orleans and RelationShep. RelationShep premiered on December 4, 2017, and followed the Southern Charm cast member as he looked for love. Southern Charm New Orleans premiered on April 15, 2018 and its second season premiered on June 2, 2019.

In February 2021, main castmembers Craig Conover and Austen Kroll were involved in a joint spin-off of Southern Charm and Summer House titled Winter House, in which Conover and Kroll join stars of Summer House for a trip to Stowe, Vermont. A preview of the spin-off aired after the fifth-season finale of Summer House in April 2021, and it premiered in October 2021. Conover and Kroll returned for the second season of Winter House, which premiered on October 13, 2022.

In May 2022, Bravo ordered a spin-off starring main cast member Leva Bonaparte titled Southern Hospitality that follows Bonaparte and the staff of her Charleston nightclub, Republic Garden & Lounge. The series debuted on November 28, 2022.

References

External links
 
 
 

2010s American reality television series
2014 American television series debuts
English-language television shows
Television shows filmed in South Carolina
Bravo (American TV network) original programming